The Úrvalsdeild karla Domestic All-First Team is an annual Úrvalsdeild karla honor bestowed on the best domestic players in the league following every season. It has been awarded since the 1987-88 season.

All-time award winners

References

Notes

External links
Icelandic Basketball Federation Official Website 

European basketball awards
Úrvalsdeild karla (basketball)